Dongfeng is a town of Dawa County in central Liaoning province, China. , it has 11 villages under its administration. It is served by Liaoning Provincial Highway 211 (S211).

See also 
 List of township-level divisions of Liaoning

References 

Township-level divisions of Liaoning
Panjin